EGF like repeats and discoidin domains 3 is a protein that in humans is encoded by the EDIL3 gene.

Function

The protein encoded by this gene is an integrin ligand. It plays an important role in mediating angiogenesis and may be important in vessel wall remodeling and development. It also influences endothelial cell behavior.

References

Further reading